Holt Copse & Joel Park is a   Local Nature Reserve (LNR) in Wokingham in Berkshire. It is owned by Wokingham Town Council and managed by the council and Holt Copse Conservation Volunteers.

Geography and site 

Holt Copse is an ancient semi-natural woodland.

Holt Copse lies on the geological change from Bagshot beds to London Clay.

History 

In 2002 the site was declared as a local nature reserve by Wokingham Borough Council.

Fauna 

The site has the following fauna:

Mammals 
Common noctule

Invertebrates 

Speckled wood

Flora 

The site has the following flora:

Trees 

Acer campestre
Corylus avellana
Ilex aquifolium
Quercus robur
Sorbus aucuparia

Plants 

Cardamine pratensis
Hyacinthoides non-scripta

References 

Parks and open spaces in Berkshire
Nature reserves in Berkshire
Local Nature Reserves in Berkshire